is a railway station on the Ainokaze Toyama Railway Line in the city of Toyama, Toyama Prefecture, Japan, operated by the third-sector railway operator Ainokaze Toyama Railway.

Lines

Station layout 
Mizuhashi Station has two opposed ground-level side platforms connected by a footbridge. The station is staffed.

Platforms

History
Mizuhashi Station opened on 16 November 1908 as a station on the Japanese Government Railways (JGR), later becoming the Japanese National Railways (JNR). It was privatized on 1 April 1987, becoming a station on JR West.

From this date, Mizuhashi Station was transferred to the ownership of the third-sector operating company Ainokaze Toyama Railway.

Adjacent stations

Passenger statistics
In fiscal 2015, the station was used by an average of 965 passengers daily (boarding passengers only).

Surrounding area 
 Mizuhashi Post Office
 Mizuhashi High School

See also
 List of railway stations in Japan

References

External links

  

Railway stations in Toyama Prefecture
Railway stations in Japan opened in 1908
Ainokaze Toyama Railway Line
Toyama (city)